John Halifax aka John Halifax, Gentleman is a 1938 British historical drama film directed by George King and starring John Warwick, Nancy Burne and Roddy McDowall. It is based on the 1856 novel John Halifax, Gentleman by Dinah Craik. It was made at Shepperton Studios as a quota quickie. The film's sets were designed by Philip Bawcombe.

Cast
 John Warwick as John Halifax
 Nancy Burne as Ursula March
 Ralph Michael as Phineas Fletcher
 D.J. Williams as Abel Fletcher
 Brian Buchel as Lord Luxmore
 Billy Bray as Tully
 Elsie Wagstaff as Jael
 W.E. Holloway as Mr. Jessop
 Hugh Bickett as Doctor Grainger
 Roddy McDowall as Boy

References

Bibliography
 Chibnall, Steve. Quota Quickies: The Birth of the British 'B' Film. British Film Institute, 2007.
 Low, Rachael. Filmmaking in 1930s Britain. George Allen & Unwin, 1985.
 Wood, Linda. British Films, 1927-1939. British Film Institute, 1986.

External links

1938 films
1930s historical drama films
British historical drama films
Films directed by George King
Films set in England
Films shot at Shepperton Studios
Films set in the 18th century
Quota quickies
Films based on British novels
Films scored by Jack Beaver
British black-and-white films
1938 drama films
1930s English-language films
1930s British films